Henry T. Gunderson High School is a high school situated in the Blossom Valley area of San Jose, California, which first opened in the fall of 1976. It drew the majority of its initial 10th - 12th grade student body from adjacent neighborhoods that were previously within the Pioneer and Leland high school boundaries. The school is part of the San Jose Unified School District and was given the maximum six-year accreditation in 2004, noting the performance of staff and faculty. As of July 2019, the school principal is Kevin Wan, and the average annual enrollment is about 1100 students.

Technology program

Gunderson High School promotes itself as a Technology Magnet school offering a variety of classes through its technologically advanced academic program.  Certain electives of the program include animation, multimedia design, digital photography, video production, computer aided design, and electronic music. Weekly school news, Gunderson Live, is also directed and broadcast by students on school televisions.

Extracurricular activities
Gunderson's school newspaper, The Paw Print, is run and maintained by journalism students and is published monthly.

Notable alumni
James Jones, NFL player
John Ottman, Academy Award winning editor of Bohemian Rhapsody

References

San José Unified School District
Public high schools in California
High schools in San Jose, California
1976 establishments in California